Kang Sun-Kyu (born April 20, 1986) is a South Korean footballer. Kang previously played for FC Rubin Kazan in the Russian Premier League and Daejeon Citizen and Gangwon FC in the K-League. In his two years with Rubin he never played in a league game, playing only for the reserves, but he played in two Russian Cup games.

References

1986 births
Living people
Association football midfielders
South Korean footballers
South Korean expatriate footballers
South Korean expatriate sportspeople in Russia
Expatriate footballers in Russia
FC Rubin Kazan players
Daejeon Hana Citizen FC players
Gangwon FC players
Russian Premier League players
K League 1 players
Konkuk University alumni
Footballers from Seoul